Athanasios Protopsaltis (born 12 September 1993) is a Cypriot-born Greek professional volleyball player. He is a member of the Greece national team. At the professional club level, he plays for Greenyard Maaseik.

Honours

Clubs
 National championships
 2009/2010  Cypriot Championship, with Anorthosis Famagusta
 2010/2011  Cypriot Championship, with Anorthosis Famagusta
 2015/2016  German SuperCup, with VfB Friedrichshafen
 2016/2017  German Cup, with VfB Friedrichshafen
 2016/2017  German SuperCup, with VfB Friedrichshafen
 2017/2018  German Cup, with VfB Friedrichshafen
 2017/2018  German SuperCup, with VfB Friedrichshafen
 2018/2019  German Cup, with VfB Friedrichshafen
 2021/2022  Greek Championship, with Panathinaikos
 2021/2022  Greek League Cup, with Panathinaikos

Individual awards
 2017: German SuperCup – Most Valuable Player
 2018: German Championship – Most Valuable Player
 2022: Greek League Cup – Most Valuable Player
 2022: Greek Championship – Best Server

References

External links
 
 Player profile at PlusLiga.pl 
 Player profile at Volleybox.net

1993 births
Living people
Sportspeople from Limassol
Greek men's volleyball players
Greek expatriate sportspeople in Cyprus
Expatriate volleyball players in Cyprus
Greek expatriate sportspeople in France
Expatriate volleyball players in France
Greek expatriate sportspeople in Germany
Expatriate volleyball players in Germany
Greek expatriate sportspeople in Poland
Expatriate volleyball players in Poland
Greek expatriate sportspeople in Belgium
Expatriate volleyball players in Belgium
Panathinaikos V.C. players
Czarni Radom players
Outside hitters